Supercard of Honor XIV was a scheduled professional wrestling pay-per-view event produced by American promotion Ring of Honor (ROH), that would have taken place on Saturday, April 4, 2020, at the RP Funding Center in Lakeland, Florida. Wrestlers from New Japan Pro-Wrestling (NJPW), and the National Wrestling Alliance (NWA) with whom ROH had partnerships, were scheduled to appear at the event. 

The event would eventually be cancelled by ROH due to the COVID-19 pandemic.

Announced matches at the time of cancellation

See also
2020 in professional wrestling
List of Ring of Honor pay-per-view events

References

Professional wrestling in Florida
2020 in professional wrestling in Florida
Events in Lakeland, Florida
ROH Supercard of Honor
April 2020 events in the United States
2020 Ring of Honor pay-per-view events
Sports events cancelled due to the COVID-19 pandemic